Dayron Robles (born 19 November 1986) is a Cuban track and field athlete who specialises in the 110 metre hurdles.

He won his first major medal (a silver) in the 60 metres hurdles at the 2006 World Indoor Championships. He finished the 2006 season having improved his outdoor best to 13 seconds and become the Central American and Caribbean Games champion. Pan American gold came the following year in which also set a meet record of 12.92 seconds at the 2007 IAAF World Athletics Final – making him the joint fourth fastest ever.

He reached the pinnacle of his event in 2008 by setting a world record of 12.87 seconds in June at the Golden Spike Ostrava meet, and winning an Olympic gold medal at the 2008 Beijing Olympics in 12.93 seconds. Injury ruled him out for much of 2009, but he returned strongly with a championship record win at the 2010 IAAF World Indoor Championships. He was disqualified at the 2011 World Championships in Athletics – Men's 110 metres hurdles, for cheating.

Career
He won his first international medal at the 2004 World Junior Championships in Athletics, taking the silver medal in the 110 m hurdles which was Cuba's only medal of the competition. At the 2006 World Indoor Championships in Moscow he finished second with a new personal best time (indoor) of 7.46 seconds. He improved upon this time with a run of 7.33 s at the 2008 PSD Bank Meeting – this was a Panamerican record and made him the second-fastest ever indoors, behind Colin Jackson.

At the 2008 World Indoor Championships in Valencia he didn't advance from the heats due to fact that he stopped running, thinking that fellow hurdler Liu Xiang had made a false start.  This was great disappointment for Robles, who had posted nine of the 11 fastest times of the winter season and was a favorite for winning the gold medal.

At the Beijing Olympics in 2008, many anticipated a Robles and Liu showdown in the final, but Liu was forced to pull out injured in the opening heat due to tendinitis. Robles went on to comfortably win the gold medal, posting a time of 12.93 s in the final.

During the 2009 IAAF World Championships, Dayron Robles was forced out of the competition, not finishing his semi-final because of muscular injury. After recovering from his injury, he entered the 2010 IAAF World Indoor Championships. The 60 metres final was the first time in over two years that Robles had faced Liu and Terrence Trammell in the same race. Robles began the race slowly but his power and technique saw him overhaul Trammell in the second half of the race to finish in 7.34 seconds, the third quickest time ever over the distance. The win marked a return to form and he said his first indoor gold ahead of the American was as important to him as his Olympic victory two years earlier.

After a season's best run of 13.12 seconds in the rain to win at the Ostrava Golden Spike meeting, he secured his first 2010 IAAF Diamond League victory at the Golden Gala with a time of 13.14 seconds, followed by a win at the Memorial Primo Nebiolo later that month. His best run of the season (13.01) at the Athletissima meet made him the second fastest man that year behind David Oliver, but an injury curtailed yet another season. He returned to action in May 2011 and won at the Grand Prix Région Guadeloupe meet.

Robles finished first in the 110m hurdles at the 2011 World Athletics Championships, with a time of 13.14 seconds. However, the result was invalidated, as replays showed Robles reaching out to impede the progress of competitor Liu Xiang, using his hand to knock Xiang's hand.

Achievements

Personal bests

All information from IAAF Profile

Competition record

References

External links

IAAF "Focus on Athletes" article

1986 births
Living people
Cuban male hurdlers
Athletes (track and field) at the 2007 Pan American Games
Athletes (track and field) at the 2008 Summer Olympics
Athletes (track and field) at the 2011 Pan American Games
Athletes (track and field) at the 2012 Summer Olympics
Athletes (track and field) at the 2016 Summer Olympics
Olympic athletes of Cuba
Olympic gold medalists for Cuba
Sportspeople from Guantánamo
Medalists at the 2008 Summer Olympics
Pan American Games gold medalists for Cuba
Pan American Games medalists in athletics (track and field)
Olympic gold medalists in athletics (track and field)
Central American and Caribbean Games gold medalists for Cuba
Competitors at the 2006 Central American and Caribbean Games
Diamond League winners
World Athletics Indoor Championships winners
Central American and Caribbean Games medalists in athletics
Medalists at the 2007 Pan American Games
Medalists at the 2011 Pan American Games
21st-century Cuban people